This is a list of awards and nominations received by Filipino-Canadian singer and actor Darren Lyndon Gonzales Espanto, best known by his stage name Darren Espanto.

Major associations

Aliw Awards
Aliw Awards by the Aliw Awards Foundation, Inc. was established by the renowned Philippine journalist Alice H. Reyes, to recognize achievements in the live entertainment industry in the Philippines.

Awit Awards
The Awit Awards are music awards in the Philippines given annually by the Philippine Association of the Record Industry (PARI) to recognize the outstanding achievements in the music industry. The word "Awit" means "song" literally in Tagalog.

Box Office Entertainment Awards
The Box Office Entertainment Awards, sometimes known as the GMMSF Box Office Entertainment Awards is an annual award ceremony held in Metro Manila and organized by Guillermo Mendoza Memorial Scholarship Foundation.

Myx Music Awards
The Myx Music Awards, currently known as the Myx Awards, are accolades presented by the cable channel Myx to honor the biggest hitmakers in the Philippines.

MOR Music Awards

PMPC Star Awards for Music
The PMPC Star Awards for Music honors Filipino music artists who have major contributions in promoting the Original Pilipino Music (OPM) industry for the past year.

Wish Music Awards
The Wish 107.5 Music Awards (abbreviated as WMA) is an accolade presented by the FM radio station Wish 107.5, which aims to pay tribute to acts and artists who have given significant contributions in the music scene in the Philippines.

Other Major Awards

Minor associations

References 

Lists of awards received by Filipino musician